Mynydd Llysiau is a subsidiary summit of Waun Fach in the Black Mountains in south-eastern Wales. It lies halfway between Waun Fach and Pen Allt-mawr. It is a distinguished summit with a steep eastern face.
 
The summit, marked by a pile of stones, is long grassy ridge. To the south is Pen Twyn Glas, before which are two boundary stones that resemble grave stones.

References

External links
 www.geograph.co.uk : photos of Mynydd Llysiau and surrounding area

Hewitts of Wales
Nuttalls
Mountains and hills of Powys
Black Mountains, Wales
Talgarth